My Giant is a 1998 American comedy film directed by Michael Lehmann. The film stars Billy Crystal, who also produced and co-wrote the story for the film, and Romanian NBA player Gheorghe Mureșan in his only film appearance. David Seltzer's script was inspired by Crystal's friendship with professional wrestler André the Giant, whom he had met during the filming of The Princess Bride.

Plot
A struggling talent agent and huckster, Sammy Kamin, travels to Romania on business after splitting up with his wife. After his young client fires him, Sammy crashes his car and is rescued, while unconscious, by an enormous Romanian man named Max who is close to 8 feet tall.

Sammy thinks the rescuer is God, as he can only see Max's giant hands. When Sammy wakes up, he thinks he is in Heaven. But he is confused to find a statue of Jesus next to his bed, as he was raised Jewish. He then realizes Max has brought him to a monastery, where he was raised after being placed for adoption by his parents because of his height.

Once he wakes up and interacts with Max, he sees potential stardom in him. Sammy attempts to broker his introduction into the movies. In doing so, he exploits Max's desire to visit a long-lost paramour, Lilliana, in Gallup, New Mexico. First, Max obtains the role of a villain in a movie, but he is so drunk that he vomits on the protagonist (Sammy's former client). However, the scene is included in the movie.

One day, Sammy talks to Steven Seagal about including Max as a villain in one of his movies, convincing him that he needs a different kind of villain. At first Seagal rejects him because there was another actor who would take that role, but he changes his opinion after listening to an extract of a Shakespearean play done by Max.

Suddenly, after some medical exams, Max is diagnosed with heart disease which cannot be treated with a transplant because his heart is so big. Sammy decides to find Lilliana, and tries to convince her to meet Max again, but she rejects the invitation. Sammy then convinces his wife to take the role of Lilliana and after some words, Max asks her for a kiss.

Afterwards, Sammy and his wife decide to get back together again, after realizing that they were truly in love and that their son needed them.

Sam got Max a three-picture deal and a TV series deal, but they left the business out on top. Sammy eventually decides to return Max home to Romania. Max refuses to go back, but finally he enters his old house, and meets his parents again and reconcile with him. Sammy ends up watching Max's first filmed scene in a cinema with his family. Max dies shortly after, because of his heart, but he changed many people's lives forever.

Cast

Reception

Box office
My Giant was not a box office success, grossing a little over $8 million domestically, far less than its $20 million budget.

Critical
My Giant gained mostly negative reviews. Roger Ebert stated: "The movie, which could have been a funny send-up of Hollywood talent requirements, gets distracted by subplots...after its promising start, My Giant isn't a comedy about an agent and a giant, so much as the heartwarming tale of a guy who learns to be a better family man."

CNN's Paul Tatara stated: "Crystal is Crystal throughout, and I still like him for it. Muresan, on the other hand, is sweet but, shall we say, a limited performer. He also speaks as if he's storing potatoes in his cheeks for the oncoming Romanian winter. He's not any good, but, then again, Harrison Ford would be hard pressed to pretend that he's 7-foot-7. "My Giant" would probably play better to children. There's an itty-bitty bit of swearing. Beware of sugar comas."

The review of the film's original VHS release from Entertainment Weekly was one of its few genuine praises, from critic David Everitt, describing the tape as "a watchable rental. Crystal's wisenheimer Long Island charm wears well, and Muresan, the 7-foot-7 Washington Wizards center, is surprisingly endearing, especially when you can understand what he's saying. Watch for Steven Seagal's amusing cameo."

Lisa Alspector of the Chicago Reader reviewed the film positively and stated "My Giant is exciting partly because it dares to get so close to [its] idea, even though it then pulls back."

On Rotten Tomatoes the film has an approval rating of 21% based on reviews from 28 critics.

References

External links
 
 
 

1998 comedy films
1998 films
American comedy films
Castle Rock Entertainment films
Columbia Pictures films
Films directed by Michael Lehmann
Films scored by Marc Shaiman
Films shot in the Czech Republic
Films with screenplays by Billy Crystal
Romanian-language films
1990s English-language films
1990s American films